Bargen is a hamlet in the northwest Netherlands, on the island and in the municipality of Texel,  North Holland. It is located 4 km northeast of Den Burg.

Bargen is not a statical entity, and the postal authorities have placed it under De Waal. It has no place name signs, and consists of a handful of houses.

In a tax register of 1561, Bargen was mentioned as having almost very poor soil.

References

Populated places in North Holland
Texel